Justice state information system is the case management and electronic court filing system for most of the Russian courts.

History
From January 1, 2017 the parties of judicial dispute had received an opportunity to submit documents to the court in electronic form by “The procedure for submission of documents in electronic form including in the form of e-document to the Supreme Court of the Russian Federation”.

See also

 CM/ECF is the case management and electronic court filing system for most of the United States Federal Courts.
 Electronic Filing System.
 Integrated Electronic Litigation System

References

Order of Submission to Federal Courts of General Jurisdiction of Documents in Electronic Form, Including Electronic Documents (Approved by Decree of the Judicial Department under the Supreme Court of the Russian Federation on December 27, 2016 No. 251) 
Online law databases

Law of Russia
Judiciary of Russia